The Marshall Attack (also called the Marshall Gambit) is a chess opening characterised by the moves:

 1. e4 e5
 2. Nf3 Nc6
 3. Bb5 a6
 4. Ba4 Nf6
 5. O-O Be7
 6. Re1 b5
 7. Bb3 O-O
 8. c3 d5

The Marshall Attack is an aggressive line in the Ruy Lopez, where Black sacrifices a pawn by playing d5 to gain initiative and a kingside attack. Frank Marshall famously debuted it in his game against José Raúl Capablanca in 1918. Although Marshall lost the game, the opening gained popularity and was adopted by many top players, still seeing use today at the top level by players such as Levon Aronian and Ding Liren. It is of particular theoretical importance as a way for Black to play actively and avoid the so-called "Spanish Torture" of the Closed Ruy Lopez. Moreover, it has led to the development of several "Anti-Marshall" lines designed to avoid its complications.

History 
The Marshall Attack had been played before 1918 by lesser known players and by Marshall himself in 1917. Its most famous game, called "one of the most famous games in history" by Chessbase Chess News, is Marshall vs. Capablanca, played in 1918 at the Manhattan Chess Club in New York.

Since its debut, many top players have adopted the opening and further developed its theory, notably Boris Spassky in his 1965 match against Mikhail Tal. An important improvement over Marshall's game against Capablanca was 11... c6 instead of Nf6. Even in the last decade, the theory has seen many improvements.

Basics 

After the main continuation to Black's pawn sacrifice, 9. exd5 Nxd5 10. Nxe5 Nxe5 11. Rxe5 c6 12. d4 Bd6 13. Re1, White's kingside has lost an important defender in the f3 knight and Black can start a powerful attack against the White king with 13... Qh4.

White also suffers from an under-developed queenside and faces some difficulties developing its remaining knight since the pawn on c3 blocks one of its squares. However, White may reach an endgame with a pawn advantage if able to withstand Black's attack.

Anti-Marshalls 
Common "Anti-Marshalls" include substituting h3 or a4 instead of 8. c3. For many years, 8. a4 was the most common owing to Garry Kasparov's victory over Nigel Short in the 1993 World Chess Championship. Recently, however, the viability of 8... b4 in response to 8. a4 has led to increased use of 8. h3 instead.

References 

Chess openings